Una Gallega en México is a 1949 Mexican family comedy film directed by Julián Soler and starring  Niní Marshall, Joaquín Pardavé, and Alma Rosa Aguirre.

References

External links
 

1949 films
1940s Spanish-language films
1949 comedy films
Mexican black-and-white films
Mexican comedy films
1940s Mexican films